Laveen School Auditorium is a historic structure located in Laveen, Arizona. It was constructed in 1940 and placed on the National Register of Historic Places in 1996.

It is a one-story adobe building with a full basement, with some elements of American Craftsman style in its dormers, gable outriggers,
bargeboards, and Spanish roof tile.  It has also been known as Building A, Laveen School.

Gallery

References

External links
 

Schools in Phoenix, Arizona
School buildings on the National Register of Historic Places in Arizona
1940 establishments in Arizona
Schools in Maricopa County, Arizona
National Register of Historic Places in Maricopa County, Arizona
School buildings completed in 1940